Luke Bateman (born 23 January 1995) is an Australian professional rugby league footballer who plays as a  and  forward for the Wynnum-Manly Seagulls in the Intrust Super Cup. He previously played for the Canberra Raiders.

Background
Bateman was born in Toowoomba, Queensland, Australia.

Bateman played his junior football for the Souths Logan Magpies and Miles Devils, before being signed by the Canberra Raiders.

Playing career

Early career
From 2013 to 2015, Bateman played for the Canberra Raiders' NYC team, captaining the side in 2014 and 2015. On 20 April 2013, Bateman played for the Queensland under-20s team against the New South Wales under-20s team, playing off the interchange bench in the 36-12 loss at Penrith Stadium. In February 2014, Bateman was selected in the Canberra Raiders 2014 Auckland Nines squad. On 3 May 2014, Bateman again played for the Queensland under-20s team against the New South Wales under-20s team, starting at lock and scoring a try in the 30-8 loss at Penrith Stadium. During the match, Bateman was sledged by halfback Mitchell Moses, calling him a ‘’fucking gay cunt’’ heard by the live tv audience and Moses was later slapped with a 2-match suspension for his derogatory comments. On 26 September 2014, Bateman extended his contract with the Raiders from the end of 2015 to the end of 2016.

2015
In January 2015, Bateman was selected in the Raiders 2015 Auckland Nines squad. In Round 1 of the 2015 NRL season, Bateman made his NRL debut for the Canberra Raiders against the Cronulla-Sutherland Sharks, playing off the interchange bench in the 24-20 win at Shark Park. On 8 July 2015, Bateman played for the Queensland under-20s team against the New South Wales under-20s team for the third year in a row, playing off the interchange bench and scoring a try in the 32-16 loss at Suncorp Stadium. Bateman finished his debut year in the NRL with him playing in 6 matches for the Raiders in the 2015 NRL season.

2016
Bateman was selected in the 2016 Auckland Nines squad with the Raiders. On 12 August 2016, Bateman extended his contract with the Raiders to the end of the 2018 season. Bateman finished the 2016 NRL season playing in 21 matches for the Raiders.

2017
Bateman was selected  in the Raiders 2017 Auckland Nines squad. In Round 21 against the South Sydney Rabbitohs, Bateman scored his first career NRL try in the 32-18 win at ANZ Stadium. Bateman finished the 2017 NRL season playing in 22 matches and scoring 1 try for the Raiders.

2018
On 7 May 2018, Bateman extended his contract with Canberra to the end of the 2019 season. Bateman finished the 2018 NRL season playing in 22 matches.

2019
Bateman made no appearances for Canberra in the 2019 NRL season.  Bateman instead played for Mounties in the Canterbury Cup NSW competition as they qualified for the finals finishing in 6th place.  Bateman played in Mounties' elimination final loss against Newtown at Campbelltown Stadium.

References

External links

Canberra Raiders profile
Raiders profile
NRL profile

1995 births
Living people
Australian rugby league players
Canberra Raiders players
Rugby league locks
Rugby league players from Toowoomba
Souths Logan Magpies players
Wynnum Manly Seagulls players